A Most Peculiar Malaysian Murder is the debut novel and the first installment in the Inspector Singh Investigates series by Shamini Flint.

Synopsis

The book opens with the murder of Alan Lee, a Malaysian Chinese businessman and playboy, with his widow the former model Chelsea Liew as the prime suspect. As Chelsea is a Singaporean and it's an election year in Singapore, the Singaporean government has sent a police detective (the titular Inspector Singh) to ensure that something is "being seen to be done" on part of the Singaporean government. 

Unsurprisingly, the case of Alan Lee's death is anything but straightforward. Shortly before his death, Alan Lee was involved in a messy divorce and child custody battle with Chelsea, and to improve his chances of gaining custody of his children, had converted to Islam to deprive Chelsea of any chance of gaining custody of her children (without converting herself, which she is loath to do). At first, the Malaysian authorities refuse to listen to Singh's request to re-open what they see as a "cut and dried case", but when Chelsea's brother-in-law Jasper confesses to the murder of his brother Alan, it forces the police to re-open investigations into the murder: inspector Singh is not convinced that Jasper did shoot his brother — the gun that killed Alan has yet to be found. 

Racing against time to reach the truth behind Alan's death, Inspector Singh and his Malaysian counterparts Inspector Mohammed and Sergeant Shukor must trawl through a twisted web of secret affairs, family feuds, forbidden love, as well as the dark side of Malaysia's logging and biofuels industry which even involves ethnic cleansing in East Malaysia ... before another murder with devastating consequences permanently shatters the fortunes of the Lee family.

References

External links
Hachette, Inspector Singh Investigates: A Most Peculiar Malaysian Murder: Number 1 in series

Crime novels
Novels set in Malaysia
2009 novels